Zee Media Corporation Limited (abbreviated as ZMCL; formerly Zee News Limited) is the news broadcasting company of the Essel Group, which is owned by Subhash Chandra. The company is engaged mainly in the business of broadcasting of news and current affairs, and regional entertainment uplinked from India via satellite television channels.

The network has been involved in several controversies and has broadcast fabricated news stories on multiple occasions.

History 
Zee Media Corporation Limited (formerly Zee News Ltd.) was founded by Essel Group and it was incorporated on 27 August 1999, as Zee Sports Ltd. It was a subsidiary of the Zee Telefilms Ltd (later renamed to Zee Entertainment Enterprises). The company was reincorporated on 27 May 2004, as Zee News Ltd.  It was demerged as a separate company of the Essel Group in 2006. In 2013, Zee News Ltd changed its name to Zee Media Corporation Limited.

It was involved in a joint venture with the Dainik Bhaskar Group for the publication of the Daily News & Analysis newspaper but the paper was discontinued in 2019 after suffering losses. The corporation also runs the Zee Institute of Media Arts (ZIMA) which is owned by Zee Learn, the schooling subsidiary of the Essel Group.

Operated channels by Zee Media Corporation 
The Zee Media Corporation Limited (ZMCL) operates a number of other channels, some in regional languages with the stated intent of providing a pan-Indian reach.

Current channels

Former/Defunct channels

Online
Zee News operates the Daily News & Analysis and Zee News websites to provide online coverage of the channel. The ZEE5 website which is owned by the Zee Entertainment Enterprises is used to platform coverage of other ZMCL channels. The World is One News (WION) channel operates its own WION website. The ZMCL also owns the India.com news website.

 Zee News Website: English and Hindi language online news coverage service of Zee News.
 Daily News & Analysis Website: English language online news coverage service. It is branded under the DNA program of Zee News.
 Zee5 Website: Streaming service which hosts ZMCL news channels.
 WION Website: English language online news coverage service of World is One News.
 India.com: English and Hindi language news website owned by ZMCL.

Newspaper

The Daily News & Analysis was an English-language broadsheet newspaper owned by the Zee Media Corporation Limited. It was launched on 30 July 2005 and branded under the Daily News & Analysis (DNA) program of Zee News. It was primarily circulated in Mumbai and discontinued on 9 October 2019 citing recurring losses.

Controversies and criticism 
Zee Media Corporation Limited has been involved in many controversies.

Jindal Group incident 
The channel was tried for allegedly extorting ₹1 billion from the Jindal Group revealed through a sting operation. Two senior journalists Sudhir Chaudhary and Sameer Ahluwalia were arrested. The two were sent to 14-day judicial custody in Tihar jail and were ultimately released on bail. Naveen Jindal had accused the two journalists of trying to extort   in advertisements for Zee News from him through blackmail by threatening to air stories against his company in the Coalgate scam. Zee News denied the charges and made counter claims of Jindal offering them   to halt their investigations against Jindal Steel's involvement in the scam but filed no charges. In July 2018, the Jindal Group withdrew the case against Zee News and both parties to the litigation stated that an out of court settlement had been reached which remains undisclosed.

Cases of fabrication

Jawaharlal Nehru University sedition controversy  

Zee News reported that students from the Democratic Students' Union (DSU) raised "anti-India" slogans such as Bharat ki barbadi (Destruction of India) and Pakistan Zindabad (Long live Pakistan) in an event on the Jawaharlal Nehru University campus. In a letter Vishwa Deepak, a journalist working at the channel gave a statement that "our biases made us hear Bhartiya Court Zindabad (Long live Indian courts) as Pakistan Zindabad." Vishwa Deepak later resigned from the channel after expressing reservations over its "biased coverage". The footage on the newscast of Zee News had formed the basis of charges filed by the Delhi Police. Sudhir Chaudhary, editor and prime time anchor of the channel however on a telecast made a statement saying "our channel only showed what was happening there, whatever we have shown is 100% authentic." A forensic report of the Delhi Police however later stated that the footage was doctored.

GPS Chips in ₹2000 currency notes 
Anchor Sudhir Chaudhary ran a Daily News and Analysis program announcing that the Indian 2000-rupee note issued after the 2016 Indian banknote demonetisation by the government have GPS chips which will allow the government to track currency, thereby reducing corruption. The Minister of Finance, Arun Jaitley dismissed the report as being rumours. The Reserve Bank of India has also given a statement that no such chips are present in the currency notes. The presence of "nano GPS" in the currency notes has been classified as a hoax being spread on social media.

Navjot Singh Sidhu – Alwar controversy 
Zee News telecasted a video with the claim that the slogans of Pakistan Zindabad were raised at a rally in Alwar presided over by the Indian National Congress politician, Navjot Singh Sidhu. Sidhu accused Zee News of playing a doctored video and threatened to file a defamation suit against Zee News. Sidhu stated that slogans of Jo Bole So Nihal were misconstrued as being in favor of Pakistan. Zee News accused Sidhu of calling a news broadcast to be fake news and sent a defamation notice to him. The notice demanded an apology from him within 24 hours and threatened to pursue legal recourse if an apology was not issued by him.

Mahua Moitra criminal defamation case 
Zee News telecasted a show featuring editor-in-chief Sudhir Chaudhary where he claimed that Trinamool Congress legislator Mahua Moitra had plagiarized author Martin Longman in her maiden speech after being elected to the Lok Sabha. Moitra accused the channel of false reporting and submitted a breach of privilege motion against Zee News and Sudhir Chaudhary. Martin Longman responded and stated that the legislator did not plagiarise him. Subsequently, Moitra filed a criminal defamation case against Chaudhary.

Coverage of 2020 Delhi election results 
The 2020 Delhi Legislative Assembly election was held on 8 February 2020. The exit poll results predicted the Aam Aadmi Party to retain their government in National capital territory of Delhi. The Zee News telecast of the exit poll results featured Sudhir Chaudhary who indulged in polemic commentary against the voters of the election. He stated that the people of Delhi had chosen Pakistan over Hindustan and that the rule of Mughals will now return. He further alleged the people of Delhi are lazy and only concerned about "freebies" and that issues like Ram Mandir, Balakot airstrike and Revocation of Article 370 do not matter to them which is why they have rejected the Bharatiya Janata Party. The telecast resulted in backlash and mockery of Zee News and Sudhir Chaudhary on social media.

Ban in Nepal 
On 9 July 2020, Nepal's satellite and cable television operators banned Zee News and some other Indian privately owned news channels, citing "propaganda and defamatory report against Nepal government".

See also 
 Essel Group
 Zee Entertainment Enterprises
 Zee News

References 

Essel Group
Television broadcasting companies of India
Mass media companies of India
Television networks in India
Broadcasting